William FitzMaurice, 2nd Earl of Kerry PC (Ire) (1694 – 4 April 1747) was an Irish peer and an officer in the British Army.

He was the eldest son of Thomas Fitzmaurice, 1st Earl of Kerry and Anne Petty. In 1738, he married Lady Gertrude Lambart, daughter of Richard Lambart, 4th Earl of Cavan, and had a son, Francis Thomas-Fitzmaurice, 3rd Earl of Kerry (1740–1818), and a daughter Anna Maria, who married Maurice FitzGerald, 16th Knight of Kerry.

On 23 June 1716, he was commissioned a captain in the 2nd Regiment of Foot Guards (ranking as lieutenant-colonel in the Army), but resigned in January 1717/8. He later became Governor of Ross Castle. He was also a Privy Counsellor in Ireland and Custos Rotulorum of Kerry (1746–1747).

The Earl of Kerry died in 1747 in Lixnaw. His wife, Gertrude, died in 1775 and was buried at St James's Church, Piccadilly, on 17 November.

External links
Petty FitzMaurice (Lansdowne) Family Tree

References

The Complete Peerage (1910-1959; Gloucester, UK: Alan Sutton Publishing, 2000), volume VII, page 213 / 214
English Lords: Kerry, Shelburne, Lansdowne, Leigh

1694 births
1747 deaths
Coldstream Guards officers
Members of the Privy Council of Ireland
William
Earls of Kerry